Gołymin  is a village in Poland, approximately  north of Warsaw. It is now divided into three sołectwos: Gołymin-Ośrodek ("Gołymin Centre"; the seat of the local municipality, called Gmina Gołymin-Ośrodek), Gołymin-Północ ("Gołymin North") and Gołymin-Południe ("Gołymin South").

Gołymin is the birthplace of politician Tomasz Nałęcz. It was also the site of the Battle of Gołymin (1806).

Villages in Ciechanów County